The following is a list of Public holidays in South Ossetia

List

References 

 
South Ossetia